Hugo Cužna (16 February 1891 – December 1961) was an Austrian rower. He competed in the men's coxed four event at the 1912 Summer Olympics.

References

1891 births
1961 deaths
Austrian male rowers
Olympic rowers of Austria
Rowers at the 1912 Summer Olympics
People from Litoměřice